Nebojša Raičević (born 1961) is a Serbian professional basketball coach and former player. Lastly, he was the head coach for Napredak Aleksinac of the Basketball League of Serbia.

Coaching career 
In 1999, Raičević founded the basketball club based in his hometown, OKK Kruševac.

In July 2013, Raičević was named the head coach for Al-Muharraq of the Bahraini Premier League.

In 2017, Raičević was hired as the new head coach of Napredak Aleksinac. His team finished second in the Second League of Serbia's 2018–19 season and got promoted to the Basketball League of Serbia for the first time in club's history. He left Napredak in February 2021.

National team coaching career 
Raičević was an assistant coach of the Yugoslavia national under-18 team at the 2000 FIBA Europe Under-18 Championship in Croatia.
  
Raičević was the head coach of the Iran national U18 team that won the gold medal at the 2008 FIBA Asia Under-18 Championship with a 6–1 record. Also, he was the Iran U19 head coach at the 2009 FIBA Under-19 World Championship in Auckland, New Zealand.

References

External links
 Nebojsa Raicevic at eurobasket.com
 Nebojsa Raicevic at realgm.com

1961 births
Living people
KK Napredak Aleksinac coaches
KK Napredak Kruševac coaches
KK Napredak Kruševac players
Serbian expatriate basketball people in Bahrain
Serbian expatriate basketball people in Iran
Serbian men's basketball coaches
Serbian men's basketball players
Sportspeople from Kruševac